"I Love the Way You Love" is a song written by Berry Gordy, Mike Ossman, Al Abrams, and John O'Den and performed by Marv Johnson featuring The Rayber Voices.  The single was produced by Berry Gordy.

Chart performance
It reached #2 on the U.S. R&B chart, #9 on the U.S. pop chart, and #35 on the UK Singles Chart in 1960.  It was featured on his 1960 album More Marv Johnson.

The song ranked #65 on Billboard magazine's Top 100 singles of 1960.

Other versions
Dicky Doo & The Don'ts released a version of the song on their 1960 album Teen Scene.
Mary Wells released a version of the song on her 1961 album Bye Bye Baby I Don't Want to Take a Chance.
Millie released a version of the song as a single in 1964 in the UK, but it did not chart.
Robbie Montgomery featuring The Kings of Rhythm Orchestra performed a version of the song that was released on Ike & Tina Turner's 1964 album Ike & Tina Turner Revue Live.
The Chosen Few released a version of the song on their 1975 album Everybody Plays the Fool.
Big Youth released a version of the song on his 1995 album Hit the Road Jack.

References

1960 songs
1960 singles
1964 singles
Songs written by Berry Gordy
Marv Johnson songs
Mary Wells songs
Millie Small songs
Song recordings produced by Berry Gordy
United Artists Records singles
Fontana Records singles